"Tell Me How You Feel" is a song by American singer and actress Joy Enriquez. It samples "Mellow Mellow Right On" by Lowrell Simon. The song was released as the second single from her debut self-titled studio album in September 2000, peaking at number 17 on the US Billboard Bubbling Under R&B/Hip-Hop Songs chart, number 24 in Australia and number 14 in New Zealand, where it was certified Gold for sales of over 5,000.

Track listings

US CD single
 "Tell Me How You Feel" – 4:06
 Snippets from Joy Enriquez
 "Shake Up the Party"
 "Situation"
 "I Can't Believe"

Australian maxi-CD single
 "Tell Me How You Feel" – 4:06
 "Tell Me How You Feel" (Full Crew remix) – 4:04
 "Between You and Me" – 4:21
 "How Can I Not Love You" – 4:33

European CD single
 "Tell Me How You Feel" (album version) – 4:06
 "Tell Me How You Feel" (Full Crew remix) – 4:05

European maxi-CD single
 "Tell Me How You Feel" (album version) – 4:06
 "Tell Me How You Feel" (Full Crew remix) – 4:05
 "Dime mi amor" (Spanish version) – 3:59
 "Tell Me How You Feel" (instrumental) – 4:05

Japanese CD single
 "Tell Me How You Feel"
 "How Can I Not Love You"

Charts

Certifications

Release history

References

External links
  at Discogs

2000 singles
2000 songs
2001 singles
Arista Records singles
Song recordings produced by Soulshock and Karlin
Songs written by Kenneth Karlin
Songs written by Soulshock